Betsy Palmer (born Patricia Betsy Hrunek; November 1, 1926 – May 29, 2015) was an American actress known for her many film and Broadway roles, television guest-starring appearances, as a panelist on the game show I've Got a Secret, and later for playing Pamela Voorhees in the 1980 film Friday the 13th.

Early life
Palmer was born Patricia Betsy Hrunek on November 1, 1926, in East Chicago, Indiana, the daughter of Marie (née Love), an adoptee, who launched the East Chicago Business College before she married, and Vincent Rudolph Hrunek (1894-1969), an industrial chemist who immigrated from Czechoslovakia, and became a stay-at-home father. She performed in school plays all through childhood, graduated from East Chicago's Roosevelt High School in 1944, then attended East Chicago Business College. After graduation, she worked as a stenographer and secretary for the car foreman on the RIP track of the B&O Railroad.  She hated it, she said, because she was shut off from people. Some time after Palmer took an aptitude test at the Chicago YWCA, which indicated a flair for the arts, her father brought a coworker home for dinner, a former New York actor who recommended she study with David Itkin. Working days and commuting to night classes from East Chicago, she graduated from the Goodman School of Drama at the Art Institute of Chicago (now at DePaul University).

Acting career

Palmer began working in summer stock in Lake Geneva, Wisconsin, then in winter stock at the Woodstock Opera House in Woodstock, Illinois, with Paul Newman, and then summer stock in Chicago with Imogene Coca. Having saved $400, she told her parents she was changing her name to Betsy Palmer and moving to New York City with Sasha Igler, who had a job in advertising. 

Palmer got her first television acting job in 1951 when she joined the cast of the 15-minute weekday television soap opera Miss Susan, which was produced in Philadelphia, and all actors traveled each day from New York City by train. She was "discovered" for this role by Norman Lessing while attending a party in the apartment of actor Frank Sutton, who was married to Toby Igler, the sister of Palmer's roommate, Sasha Igler. She had been in Manhattan less than one week. 

A life member of the Actors Studio, Palmer's stage work included a tour of South Pacific (as Nellie Forbush) and a summer-stock season in the title role in Maggie, the 1953 musical adaptation of What Every Woman Knows by William Roy and Hugh Thomas.

In 1953, she created the role of Virginia in the original teleplay version of Paddy Chayefsky's Marty. Also in 1953, she appeared in a Studio One television broadcast of Hound-Dog Man with Jackie Cooper and others. She became a familiar face on television as a news reporter on Today in 1958 (the Today Girl), and a long-running regular panelist on the quiz show I've Got a Secret. She joined the show's original run, replacing Faye Emerson in 1958 and remaining until the show's finale in 1967. She did not reprise her role in any of the various revivals of the show. Palmer was the last surviving member of the I've Got a Secret first version's cast.

Palmer appeared as Kitty Carter in The Long Gray Line (1955), starring Tyrone Power and Maureen O'Hara. She also played nurse Lt. Ann Girard (the main female character) in Mister Roberts (1955), starring with Henry Fonda, Jack Lemmon, James Cagney, and William Powell. In the same year, she played Carol Lee Phillips in Queen Bee, which starred Joan Crawford.

Palmer starred alongside Anthony Perkins and Fonda again in the Paramount production of The Tin Star (1957).

In 1958, she played undercover agent Phyllis Carter/Lynn Stuart in the film The True Story of Lynn Stuart, co-starring Jack Lord and featuring Kim Spalding as her husband, Ralph Carter.

Palmer appeared in seven Broadway shows. All the original productions had short runs, but she replaced other actresses in long-run shows, notably Lauren Bacall in Cactus Flower in 1967, and Ellen Burstyn in Same Time Next Year in 1977. In 1976, Palmer was the actress whom Tennessee Williams chose to embody the frustrated lead, Alma Winemiller, in his The Eccentricities of a Nightingale.

Palmer's Mercedes-Benz stopped working on the highway to her home in Connecticut after a performance in New York City. She arrived home at five o'clock in the morning, so she resolved to replace her car, and later, her daughter suggested that the Volkswagen Scirocco was a cute car and it was $10,000. The offer of $1000 a day for 10 days work on location at a Boy Scout camp in New Jersey, to fund the car purchase, was a reason for taking her most famous, recent role, Friday the 13th. She recounted, in an interview, that her initial reaction to the experience was: "What a piece of shit! Nobody is ever going to see this thing." Despite her distaste for the film, she reluctantly consented to a cameo appearance in Friday the 13th Part 2. She ultimately came to accept and celebrate her participation in the franchise, as it made her more famous rather than infamous; she eventually commented "I was dumb, 'Friday the 13th' is an excellent film." Palmer was asked to reprise her role as Mrs. Voorhees in Freddy vs. Jason in 2003 and agreed to return, but she ultimately turned down the role after being offered a surprisingly low salary.

In 1982, Palmer created the role of Suzanne Becker on the CBS daytime soap opera As the World Turns. From 1989 to 1990, the actress appeared on Knots Landing as Virginia "Ginny" Bullock, the aunt of Valene Ewing (played by series star Joan Van Ark). Palmer acted in a Mayfield Dinner Theatre production of On Golden Pond in Edmonton, Alberta, in 1997.

In 2002, Palmer provided the voice of the title character, the ghost of a witch, for the horror film Bell Witch: The Movie, released in 2007.

In 2005, at around 79 years old, she appeared as Trudie Tredwell in the horror short Penny Dreadful, and in 2007, at 81, as the older version of the title character in Waltzing Anna.

Palmer appeared in the 2006 documentary, Betsy Palmer: Scream Queen Legend, as part of the publicity for the 2007 release of Bell Witch: The Movie.

Personal life
Palmer dated James Dean; the two met while working on an episode of Studio One television series. 

Palmer married Vincent J. Merendino, an obstetrician-gynecologist, in 1954, whom she met in New York on a blind date. They divorced in 1971 after 17 years. She had one daughter, Melissa.

Palmer died of natural causes on May 29, 2015, at a hospice care center in Danbury, Connecticut. She was 88.

Filmography

Television appearances
From 1953 to 2001, Palmer was a guest star on 73 television programs, including (in no particular order):

Marty (1953) as Virginia
The Philco-Goodyear Television Playhouse (1953–1956) as Janice Gans / Virginia
Studio One in Hollywood (1953–1957)
Janet Dean, Registered Nurse (1954) as The Jinx Nurse
Lux Video Theatre (1954) as Intermission Guest
The Goodyear Playhouse (1954–1957) as Paula Ferris
Appointment with Adventure (1955)
I've Got a Secret (1955-1967) as herself
Kraft Television Theatre (1956-1957)
Playhouse 90 (1958) as Kitty Duval / Emmy Verdon
Password (1961-1964) as herself
The Mike Douglas Show (1966-1971) as herself
The Joey Bishop Show (1967) as herself
The Today Show (1968) as herself
The $10,000 Pyramid (1973) as herself 
The New Candid Camera (1974) as herself 
The Love Boat (1982) as Millicent Holton
Murder, She Wrote (1985-1989) as Valerie / Lila Norris
Charles in Charge (1987) as Gloria
Newhart (1987) as Gayle Crowley
Out of This World (1987-1988) as Donna's Mom
Knots Landing (1989–1990) as Virginia Bullock
Columbo: Death Hits the Jackpot (1991) as Martha Lamarr
Just Shoot Me! (1998) as Rhonda
Hallmark Hall of Fame
Toast of the Town
Chips

Awards

References

External links

 
 
 
 
 
 Skip E. Lowe (1988) Interview: Betsy Palmer and singer Jill Corey

1926 births
2015 deaths
Actresses from Indiana
American film actresses
American stage actresses
American television actresses
American people of Czech descent
DePaul University alumni
People from East Chicago, Indiana
American television personalities
American women television personalities
21st-century American women